Lisiec may refer to the following places in Poland:
Lisiec, Lower Silesian Voivodeship (south-west Poland)
Lisiec, Warmian-Masurian Voivodeship (north Poland)